Anokhi (Hindi for "remarkable" or "unique") is an Indian retailer based in Jaipur, Rajasthan, which retails textiles, clothing, furnishings, and accessories, made with traditional Indian motifs and techniques. It was founded in 1970 by husband and wife, John and Faith Singh, with a focus on reviving traditional Rajasthani hand-block or woodcut printing techniques, and the use of natural vegetable dyes. Anokhi works directly with Rajasthani craftspeople, and retails through its 25 stores in India and a few stockists in Europe and the United States.

History
Anokhi was started by John and Faith Singh in 1970, with the aim of creating contemporary products using traditional Indian techniques. Anokhi's focus was on reviving the hand-block printing techniques of Rajasthani craftspeople in an era of mass-produced clothing.

Operations
Anokhi  works directly with artisans who live in villages around Jaipur. The designs are made in-house and are then delivered, along with fabrics, dyes, and woodblocks, to the artisans who finish the prints in their homes. As block-printing has been traditionally practised by males, Anokhi involves rural women by commissioning their work in areas such as embroidery, appliqué, beadwork and patchwork; to encourage women in villages to seek employment, Anokhi runs a daycare centre at the manufacturing plant and provides educational support for their children.

Anokhi Museum of Hand Printing
The company also runs the Anokhi Museum of Hand Printing in Jaipur, which was reported in The New York Times to be the only museum in India dedicated to the art of hand-block printing. The museum is located in a restored haveli whose restoration work was awarded the UNESCO Heritage Award for Cultural Conservation in 2000.

Bibliography

References

External links

Anokhi USA
Anokhi Museum of Hand Printing - Lonely Planet

Clothing retailers of India
Clothing brands of India
Home decor retailers
Textile companies of India
Clothing companies established in 1970
Retail companies established in 1970
Indian companies established in 1970
Companies based in Rajasthan
1970 establishments in Rajasthan